The Apauwar Coast languages, also known as Samarokena–Airoran, is a pair of closely related languages of Indonesian West Papua. They are the closest relatives of the Kwerba languages.

References

Languages of Indonesia
Kwerbic languages